The 2008 season of the Faroe Islands Premier League was the 66th season of the Faroese top-tier football since its establishment. It started on 29 March 2008 with a match between B36 Tórshavn and ÍF Fuglafjørður. The match was won by B36 with 4–0. The last games were played on 25 October 2008. NSÍ Runavík were the defending champions.

Team changes from the previous season
AB Argir and VB Vágur were relegated to 1. deild after finishing 9th and 10th in the 2007 season. They were replaced by 1. deild champions B68 Toftir and runners-up ÍF Fuglafjørður.

Further, GÍ Gøta merged with 1. deild club Leirvík ÍF and therefore formed the club named Víkingur Gøta.

Overview

League table

Results
The schedule consisted of a total of 27 games. Each team played three games against every opponent in no particular order. At least one of the games was at home and one was away. The additional home game for every match-up was randomly assigned prior to the season.

Regular home games

Additional home games

Top goalscorers
Source: soccerandequipment.com

20 goals
 Arnbjørn Hansen (EB/Streymur)

15 goals
 Andrew av Fløtum (HB Tórshavn)

12 goals
 Hans Pauli Samuelsen (EB/Streymur)

11 goals
 Rodrigo Silva (KÍ Klaksvík)

9 goals
 Bartal Eliasen (ÍF Fuglafjørður)
 Károly Potemkin (NSÍ Runavík)
 Andreas Lava Olsen (Víkingur Gøta)

8 goals
 Øssur Dalbúð (NSÍ Runavík)

7 goals
 Jákup á Borg (B36 Tórshavn)
 Clayton Soares (B71 Sandoy)
 Christian Høgni Jacobsen (HB Tórshavn)

See also
 2008 Faroe Islands Cup

References

External links
 Official website 
 Faroe Islands soccer news, results and information

Faroe Islands Premier League seasons
1
Faroe
Faroe